Rubén Pérez Chueca (born 7 August 1980) is a Spanish retired footballer who played as a goalkeeper.

He spent most of his career with Gimnàstic, competing with the club in all three major levels of Spanish football and appearing in 241 official matches in eight years.

Club career
Born in Zaragoza, Aragon, Pérez began his career with CF Figueruelas in the Segunda División B, moving to the Tercera División with neighbouring SD Huesca in the summer of 2000 and achieving promotion to the former in his first season. He continued competing at that level the following years, with Deportivo Alavés B and CD Badajoz.

In January 2006, Pérez signed with Gimnàstic de Tarragona of Segunda División, playing his first game with the Catalans on 26 February against Lorca Deportiva CF. He appeared in a further 16 matches, as the campaign ended in promotion.

In 2006–07, Pérez battled with Albano Bizzarri for first-choice status, making his La Liga debut on 28 October 2006 in a 1–3 home loss to Real Madrid. Both players ended the season with roughly the same number of appearances, and Nàstic returned to where it had come from in June.

Pérez played second-fiddle to loanee Roberto in the 2007–08 season, but regained his starting position in the following years, with relegation to the third division befalling in 2012. In July of that year, he renewed his contract for two more seasons with the option to a third.

On 31 January 2014, after being left out of the squad for the campaign, Pérez cut ties with Gimnàstic and moved to fellow league team SD Huesca on 3 February. He left the latter club in May, and joined amateurs CDC Torreforta in August, where he was used as a centre back.

On 28 January 2015, Pérez returned to the goal and the third tier, signing for CF Reus Deportiu.

References

External links

1980 births
Living people
Footballers from Zaragoza
Spanish footballers
Association football goalkeepers
La Liga players
Segunda División players
Segunda División B players
Tercera División players
Divisiones Regionales de Fútbol players
SD Huesca footballers
Deportivo Alavés B players
CD Badajoz players
Gimnàstic de Tarragona footballers
CF Reus Deportiu players